"It's Not My Cross to Bear" is a song by the Allman Brothers Band, written by Gregg Allman, that was released on their 1969 debut album. The song was written about a former lover that Gregg knew. It was also one of the first songs Gregg introduced to the group. The song was often performed live in conjunction with Spencer Davis' "Don't Want You No More", due to the way the record was produced.  In 1986, Gregg recorded an arrangement for his record, I'm No Angel.

Blues resemblance 
The song conveys the feel and tone of a blues song, but does not follow any of the usual eight-bar blues or twelve-bar blues progressions. The song has harmonic resemblance to Howlin' Wolf's recordings of "Sitting on Top of the World" in its inclusion of a minor IV chord in the fourth measure of the progression, while also harmonically resembling "Trouble in Mind", a blues standard. The eight-bar blues progression in "It's Not My Cross to Bear" is played using B major as the tonic chord:

References

1969 songs
The Allman Brothers Band songs
Song recordings produced by Adrian Barber